The 1980 New York Cosmos season was the tenth season for the New York Cosmos in the now-defunct North American Soccer League. The Cosmos completed their third double, finishing 1st in the overall league table and defeating the Fort Lauderdale Strikers 3–0 in Soccer Bowl '80.

Squad 

Source:

Results 
Source:

Friendlies

Preseason

Regular season 
Pld = Games Played, W = Wins, L = Losses, GF = Goals For, GA = Goals Against, Pts = Points
6 points for a win, 1 point for a shootout win, 0 points for a loss, 1 point for each goal scored (up to three per game).

National Eastern Division Standings

Overall League Placing 

Source:

Matches

Postseason

Overview

First round

Quarter-finals

Semi-finals

Soccer Bowl '80

Matches

References

See also
1980 North American Soccer League season
List of New York Cosmos seasons

New York
New York Cosmos seasons
New York
New York Cosmos
Soccer Bowl champion seasons